Stavros Reservation is a nature reserve located in Essex, Massachusetts.  The property is owned by The Trustees of Reservations through a 1952 gift and a 1955 purchase. Most of the approximately  reservation consists of salt marsh. The property encompasses Whites Hill, which includes fine views of the Massachusetts coast, including Crane Beach.

References

External links 
 The Trustees of Reservations: Stavros Reservation

The Trustees of Reservations
Protected areas of Essex County, Massachusetts
Open space reserves of Massachusetts
Protected areas established in 1952
1952 establishments in Massachusetts